Wu Guoshan is a Chinese Paralympic athlete. He represented China at the Summer Paralympics in 2012, 2016 and 2021. He won the gold medal in the men's shot put F57 event at both the 2016 Summer Paralympics and the 2020 Summer Paralympics.

He won two medals at the 2015 World Championships: the gold medal in the men's discus throw F57 event and the bronze medal in the men's shot put F57 event. Two years later, at the 2017 World Championships he also won two medals: the silver medal in the men's shot put F57 event and the bronze medal in the men's discus throw F57 event. In 2019, he won a bronze medal in the men's shot put F57 event at the 2019 World Championships held in Dubai, United Arab Emirates.

References

External links 
 

Living people
Year of birth missing (living people)
Place of birth missing (living people)
Athletes (track and field) at the 2012 Summer Paralympics
Athletes (track and field) at the 2016 Summer Paralympics
Athletes (track and field) at the 2020 Summer Paralympics
Medalists at the 2016 Summer Paralympics
Medalists at the 2020 Summer Paralympics
Paralympic athletes of China
Paralympic gold medalists for China
Chinese male discus throwers
Chinese male shot putters
Paralympic medalists in athletics (track and field)
Medalists at the World Para Athletics Championships
21st-century Chinese people
Paralympic shot putters
Wheelchair discus throwers
Wheelchair shot putters
Medalists at the 2018 Asian Para Games